{{Infobox tennis circuit season
| 2016 WTA Awards

| player_of_the_year               =  Angelique Kerber
| most_improved_player_of_the_year =  Johanna Konta
| newcomer_of_the_year             =  Naomi Osaka
| comeback_player_of_the_year      =  Dominika Cibulková
| previous = 2015
| next     = 2017
}}

The 2016 WTA Awards are a series of awards given by the Women's Tennis Association to players who have achieved something remarkable during the 2016 WTA Tour.

The awards
These awards are decided by either the media, the players, the association, or the fans. Nominees were announced by the WTA's Twitter account.

Note: award winners in bold

Player of the Year
 Karolína Plíšková
 Serena Williams
 Garbiñe Muguruza
 Angelique Kerber Simona Halep

Doubles Team of the Year
 Ekaterina Makarova &  Elena Vesnina Caroline Garcia &  Kristina Mladenovic Martina Hingis &  Sania Mirza
 Bethanie Mattek-Sands &  Lucie Šafářová

Most Improved Player of the Year
 Johanna Konta Laura Siegemund
 Monica Puig
 Kiki Bertens

Newcomer of the Year
 Jeļena Ostapenko
 Naomi Osaka Louisa Chirico
 Viktorija Golubic

Comeback Player of the Year
 Elena Vesnina
 Anastasija Sevastova
 Dominika Cibulková Shelby Rogers
 Vania King

Karen Krantzcke Sportsmanship Award
 Petra KvitováPeachy Kellmeyer Player Service Award
 Lucie ŠafářováDiamond Aces
 Simona HalepFan Favourite Player
 Angelique Kerber
 Sania Mirza
 Serena Williams
 Agnieszka Radwańska Simona Halep
 Dominika Cibulková
 Karolína Plíšková
 Garbiñe Muguruza
 Madison Keys
 Petra Kvitová
 Victoria Azarenka
 Elina Svitolina
 Venus Williams
 Caroline Wozniacki
 Elena Vesnina
 Ekaterina Makarova
 Alizé Cornet
 Belinda Bencic
 Eugenie Bouchard
 Sara Errani
 Jelena Janković
 Andrea Petkovic
 Lucie Šafářová
 Ana Ivanovic
 Sabine Lisicki

Post of the Year
 Angelique Kerber
 Monica Puig Serena Williams
 Dominika Cibulková
 Caroline Wozniacki

Selfie of the Year
 Serena Williams
 Angelique Kerber Ana Ivanovic
 Caroline Wozniacki
 Daria Gavrilova

#TBT (Throwback Thursday) of the Year
 Caroline Wozniacki 
 Venus Williams
 Serena Williams
 Heather Watson
 Garbiñe Muguruza

LOL of the Year
 Andrea Petkovic
 Victoria Azarenka Serena Williams
 Bethanie Mattek-Sands
 Naomi Osaka

Pet of the Year
 Venus Williams
 Serena Williams
 Monica Puig Dominika Cibulková
 Caroline Wozniacki

Fan Favourite WTA Video of the Year
 WTA Emoji Challenge 2.0()
 Alize Cornet WTA Frame Challenge
 WTA Cracker Challenge
 WTA Spelling Bee
 Jelena Ostapenko Selfie Challenge

Fan Favorite WTA Shot of the Year
 Caroline Wozniacki, 2016 Auckland Open first round (7%)
 Agnieszka Radwańska, 2016 BNP Paribas Open third round (62%)()
 Simona Halep, 2016 Rogers Cup second round (21%)
 Kirsten Flipkens, 2016 Korea Open first round (10%)

Fan Favorite WTA Match of the Year
 Jelena Jankovic vs.  Belinda Bencic, Dubai first round (4–6, 7–5, 6–4)
 Agnieszka Radwańska vs.  Dominika Cibulková, Indian Wells second round (6–3, 3–6, 7–5)
 Victoria Azarenka vs.  Garbiñe Muguruza, Miami fourth round (7–6, 7–6)
 Daria Gavrilova vs.  Simona Halep, Rome second round (6–3, 4–6, 6–3)
 Carla Suárez Navarro vs.  Angelique Kerber, Birmingham quarterfinal (6–4, 1–6, 7–5)
 Caroline Wozniacki vs.  Agnieszka Radwańska, Tokyo semifinal (4–6, 7–5, 6–4) Petra Kvitová vs  Angelique Kerber, Wuhan third round (6–7, 7–5, 6–4) Madison Keys vs.  Petra Kvitová, Beijing quarterfinal (6–3, 6–7, 7–6)
 Svetlana Kuznetsova vs.  Agnieszka Radwańska, WTA Finals round robin (7–5, 1–6, 7–5)
 Dominika Cibulková vs.  Svetlana Kuznetsova, WTA Finals semifinal (1–6, 7–6, 6–4)

Fan Favorite Grand Slam Match of the Year
 Johanna Konta vs.  Ekaterina Makarova, Australian Open fourth round (4–6, 6–4, 8–6)
 Angelique Kerber vs.  Serena Williams, Australian Open final (6–4, 3–6, 6–4)
 Samantha Stosur vs.  Lucie Šafářová, French Open third round (6–3, 6–7, 7–5)
 Garbiñe Muguruza vs.  Serena Williams, French Open final (7–5, 6–4)
 Venus Williams vs.  Daria Kasatkina, Wimbledon third round (7–5, 4–6, 10–8)
 Svetlana Kuznetsova vs.  Sloane Stephens, Wimbledon third round (6–7, 6–2, 8–6) Dominika Cibulková vs.  Agnieszka Radwańska, Wimbledon fourth round (6–3, 5–7, 9–7) Karolína Plíšková vs.  Venus Williams, US Open fourth round (4–6, 6–4, 7–6)
 Serena Williams vs.  Simona Halep, US Open quarterfinal (6–2, 4–6, 6–3)
 Angelique Kerber vs.  Karolína Plíšková, US Open final (6–3, 4–6, 6–4)

Best Dressed of the Year
 Eugenie Bouchard, Connecticut Open
 Victoria Azarenka, Indian Wells
 Venus Williams, US Open
 Bethanie Mattek-Sands, Indian Wells
 Garbiñe Muguruza, Rome
 Angelique Kerber, US Open
 Sloane Stephens, Acapulco
 Simona Halep, Madrid
 Serena Williams, Wimbledon'''
 Agnieszka Radwańska, Miami
 Ana Ivanovic, Roland Garros

References

WTA Awards
WTA Awards